Lee Hyo-jung (Hangul: 이효정, Hanja: 李孝貞; ; born 13 January 1981) is a South Korean former badminton player.

She won the gold medal in badminton mixed doubles at the 2008 Summer Olympics with her partner, Lee Yong-dae. Lee Hyo-jung and Lee Yong-dae were unseeded, and in the finals they beat the top seeds and 2005 and 2007 world champions Lilyana Natsir and Nova Widianto of Indonesia, 21-11, 21-17.

Lee Hyo-jung also won the silver medal in badminton women's doubles at the aforementioned Olympics with Lee Kyung-won; they were seeded fourth and lost to the second-seeded Chinese pair, Du Jing and Yu Yang.

Lee became the first woman in Korean history to win gold medals at both the Olympics and the Asian Games. In the 2010 Asian Games, she partnered with Shin Baek-cheol instead of her usual partner, Lee Yong-dae.  After winning the medal, she announced her retirement despite many pleas from her coaches and fans at home to continue playing until the London Olympics in 2012.

Career
In 1998, Lee who attended the Haksan Girls' High School won the girls' singles, doubles, and mixed doubles events at the German Junior tournament. She was competed at the World and Asian Junior Championships. At the World Junior, she partnered with Jun Woul-sik in the girls' doubles and Choi Min-ho in the mixed doubles, captured the bronze and silver medals respectively. She and Jun also won the silver medal at the Asian Junior. Lee junior competed in some international senior (level 4) tournament, and won double titles at the Korea and Sri Lanka International, also women's doubles title at the Hungarian, Australian and Norwegian International tournaments.

In 2000, Lee won the Asian Championships in the women's doubles event with her partner Yim Kyung-jin. At the age of 19, Lee competed at the Sydney Olympics in the women's doubles with Yim and in the mixed doubles with Lee Dong-soo. She and Yim defeated in the second round, while with Lee Dong-soo defeated in the first round.

In 2002, she finished as the runners-up at the Chinese Taipei and Singapore Open in the women's doubles event with Hwang Yu-mi. In 2003, she and Hwang also the runner-up at the Thailand and Chinese Taipei Open. In the mixed doubles event, Lee who was teamed-up with Kim Yong-hyun achieved their best result by winning the bronze medal at the Asian Championships.  In 2004, Lee competed for Korea at the Summer Olympics in women's and mixed doubles with partner Hwang Yu-mi and Kim Yong-hyun. Lee and Hwang had a bye in the first round and defeated Cheng Wen-Hsing and Chien Yu Chin of Chinese Taipei in the second. In the quarterfinals, Lee and Hwang lost to Zhao Tingting and Wei Yili of China 8–15, 15–6, 15–13. In the mixed doubles event, Lee and Kim were seeded three, but the pairs defeat by the Danish pair in the second round in the rubber game.

In 2008, Lee  won her first All England Open Championship title in women's doubles with partner Lee Kyung-won, beating Yang Wei and Zhang Jiewen in the semifinals and Du Jing and Yu Yang in the final. In August, she and Lee Yong-dae won mixed doubles gold medals in Beijing Olympics, beating Lilyana Natsir and Nova Widianto of Indonesia and also with Lee Kyung-won grabbed the silver medal in the women's doubles event. In 2009, Lee and Lee Yong-dae became world number one. They won three titles: Korea Open Super Series, Asian Badminton Championship, and China Open Super Series. They also played for Korea in Sudirman Cup in May. In the final, Korea lost to China 0-3. Lee and Lee were defeated by the Chinese pair, Zheng Bo and Yu Yang.

In 2010, Lee competed in the 2010 Uber Cup as a member of the South Korean women's national team. There she led her team to its first Uber Cup trophy, winning all 4 doubles matches she competed in through the tourney. In the finals, she and her partner Kim Min-jung won against WR #1 Ma Jin and Wang Xiaoli, beating them 18–21, 21–12, 21–15. Although Lee and Kim were not regular partners and Lee Hyo-Jung stopped playing WD regularly in international games, Lee played exceptionally well, proving why she was the most successful player in the 2008 Olympics, winning both gold and silver medals. In June, Lee continued on playing women's doubles with Kim Min-jung, winning the Indonesia Open and the Chinese Taipei Grand Prix Gold, and finishing as a runner-up in the Singapore Open. While waiting for Lee Yong-dae to recover from his injury, she played mixed doubles with Shin Baek-cheol.

In August, Lee partnered again with Lee Yong-dae in the Kumpoo Macau Open Badminton Championships, Chinese Taipei Grand Prix Gold, and World Championship, but their best finish was reaching the quarterfinals in the Chinese Taipei Grand Prix. They were hit with Lee Hyo Jung's back injury and Lee Yong-dae getting used to playing again after rehab and possibly not fully recovering from the previous injury. Due to these reasons, the head coach of the Korea Badminton Team was quoted as saying that Lee Hyo-jung and Lee Yong-dae had not had sufficient time to practice together. Lee Yong-dae decided to stop playing mixed doubles altogether, possibly due to the strain on his injured elbow from playing both men's and mixed doubles. In November, Lee Hyo-jung entered Asian Games in three games total: women's, mixed, and team event. In the women's doubles and team event, she won bronze medals. However, in mixed doubles, she partnered with Shin Baek-cheol, with whom she had previously played only two tournaments, but they still managed to win against two Chinese pairs (Zhang Nan and Zhao Yunlei, He Han Bin and Ma Jin) at their home court, becoming the first woman in Korean history to win both Olympic and Asian Game gold medals.

Achievements

Olympic Games 
Women's doubles

Mixed doubles

BWF World Championships 
Women's doubles

Mixed doubles

Asian Games 
Women's doubles

Mixed doubles

Asian Championships 
Women's doubles

Mixed doubles

World Junior Championships 
Girls' doubles

Mixed doubles

Asian Junior Championships 
Girls' doubles

BWF Superseries  
The BWF Superseries, launched on 14 December 2006 and implemented in 2007, is a series of elite badminton tournaments, sanctioned by Badminton World Federation (BWF). BWF Superseries has two level such as Superseries and Superseries Premier. A season of Superseries features twelve tournaments around the world, which introduced since 2011, with successful players invited to the Superseries Finals held at the year end.

Women's doubles

Mixed doubles

 BWF Superseries Finals tournament
 BWF Superseries Premier tournament
 BWF Superseries tournament

BWF Grand Prix 
The BWF Grand Prix has two levels: Grand Prix and Grand Prix Gold. It is a series of badminton tournaments, sanctioned by Badminton World Federation (BWF) since 2007. The World Badminton Grand Prix has been sanctioned by the International Badminton Federation since 1983.

Women's doubles

Mixed doubles

 BWF Grand Prix Gold tournament
 BWF & IBF tournament

BWF International Challenge/Series/Satellite
Women's doubles

Mixed doubles

 BWF International Challenge tournament
 BWF International Series tournament

References

External links 

 
 
 
 

South Korean female badminton players
1981 births
Living people
Sportspeople from Busan
Badminton players at the 2000 Summer Olympics
Badminton players at the 2004 Summer Olympics
Badminton players at the 2008 Summer Olympics
Medalists at the 2008 Summer Olympics
Olympic badminton players of South Korea
Olympic gold medalists for South Korea
Olympic silver medalists for South Korea
Olympic medalists in badminton
Asian Games medalists in badminton
Badminton players at the 2002 Asian Games
Badminton players at the 2006 Asian Games
Badminton players at the 2010 Asian Games
Medalists at the 2002 Asian Games
Medalists at the 2006 Asian Games
Medalists at the 2010 Asian Games
Asian Games gold medalists for South Korea
Asian Games silver medalists for South Korea
Asian Games bronze medalists for South Korea
World No. 1 badminton players